USS Platte may refer to the following ships of the United States Navy:

  was a  launched in 1939 and scrapped in 1971.
  was a  launched in 1982 and scrapped in 2014.

United States Navy ship names